Rakata is a volcanic cone on the Indonesian island of Krakatoa; also a synonym for that island.

Rakata may also refer to:

Rakata (Star Wars), a race in the fictional Star Wars universe
Rakata (song), a song by reggaeton artists Wisin y Yandel
Rakata, a song by Arca which is featured on Kick II